Marvel Legends is an action figure line based on the characters of Marvel Comics, initially produced by Toy Biz, then by Hasbro.

The line initially began as a spin-off of the Spider-Man Classics line, which were also produced by Toy Biz. At its inception in 2002, the Marvel Legends line copied the clam-shell packaging and the included comic book that had shipped with the Spider-Man Classics line. The first wave of Marvel Legends included the heroes of Iron Man, Captain America, and the Hulk, with the villain being Toad. Beginning January 1, 2007, Hasbro became the new license holder to the rights to produce toys and games based upon the Marvel Universe. The new Hasbro packaging did not include a comic book and the new molds eliminated finger joints, which were a mainstay during the Toy Biz era, but the company did continue with the theme of Build-A-Figure pieces. During the late 2000s, production on the Marvel Legends line slowed down to the point where it was rumored that it may be cancelled, but Hasbro revealed (at the 2010 San Diego Comic-Con) that due to fan requests and the upcoming movies based on Marvel characters, the line would be making a comeback in 2012, and in January 2012, Marvel Legends returned to store shelves.

At the 2013 San Diego Comic Con, Hasbro announced that Marvel Legends would be given a new start as the Marvel Legends Infinite Series starting with the Mandroid series. Initially, the Marvel Legends line has used the "chase" concept to introduce figures based on less popular or recognisable characters. These got their nickname by being shipped in fewer quantities than the rest of the figures, thus causing collectors to chase after them. Eventually, rather than entirely new figures, the chase concept evolved into variants (such as an alternate head or a different colour scheme) of a figure released in that same series. These figures retained being sought-after by collectors. A Marvel Legends Flatman "figure" was included as a joke cut-out in the GLX-Mas Special (2005). It featured "infinite" points of articulation and three action phrases (to be said with one's own voice).

Toy Biz

Build-A-Figure
In 2005, Toy Biz introduced the "Build-A-Figure" (referred to as a "BAF" in the collector community) starting with series 9. Each figure in the series was packaged with a piece of a larger figure. A consumer who bought each figure in the assortment would then have all the complete components to assemble a character unavailable in individual packaging.

Box Sets

NOTE: The translucent variants of both Human Torch and Invisible Woman were available in a stand-alone variant gift set.
NOTE: All figures were exclusive to this gift pack, and each had a display stand.

Face-Off (2006)
Each set includes a base with a background and flight stands.

Hasbro

After Hasbro gained the rights to produce Marvel toys, the company continued with the theme of Build-A-Figure pieces. Also, Hasbro's new molds mostly eliminated finger joints, a mainstay of the Toy Biz era, and the comic book pack-ins.
All the figures in the Terrax and Arnim Zola waves were labelled with a "The Return of Marvel Legends" sticker.
The Hit-Monkey, Rocket Raccoon, and Jubilee waves used the "Mini" Build-A-Figure concept.

Exclusives

Marvel released multiple exclusive toys in the series.

Showdown

Marvel Legends Showdown is a collectible tabletop game in which the primary component is  action figures and cards. It was a collaboration between Upper Deck Entertainment and Toy Biz. Originally known as Marvel Superhero Showdown.

Unleashed (2008)
The figures were produced by Hasbro and feature multiple points of articulation.

Icons

Toy Biz
Figures come with an "Evolution of an Icon" comic sized book including a history and statistics of the character as well as artwork.

Hasbro

12-Inch
In 2016, 12-inch Legends returned effectively reviving the concept of the Icons line in all but name. The figures are more expensive and are therefore aimed at a more adult collector market.

Prop Replicas
In 2016, Hasbro announced a line of high end role play accessories. After the release of the first two items, a poll was held to determine future entries in the line.

Box sets

Retro 3.75-Inch
Smaller figures done in the style of the superhero toys made by Kenner and Mattel during the 1980s. Each figure features five points of articulation and retro-inspired packaging.

Deluxe Retro 3.75"
Oversized figures and vehicles in the 3.75" scale.

Announced

Non-BAF waves

Single releases

Box sets

The Infinity Saga
A special 2021 series of figures featuring characters from the Infinity Saga that had not been released in prior movie waves.

Infinity Saga box sets

Deluxe

Retro

Retro single releases

Marvel Legends 20th Anniversary
A special premium line dedicated to updating the characters featured in the very first wave of ToyBiz Marvel Legends from 2002, complete with retro-style packaging.

Beyond Amazing
A special Spider-Man-themed promotion designed to coincide with the character's 60th anniversary in 2022.

Beyond Amazing box sets

X-Men 60th Anniversary
A premium line celebrating the 60th anniversary of the X-Men franchise in 2023.

X-Men 60th Anniversary deluxe figures

X-Men 60th Anniversary box sets

Avengers: Beyond Earth's Mightiest
A premium line celebrating the 60th anniversary of the Avengers.

Beyond Earth's Mightiest deluxe figures

Beyond Earth's Mightiest box sets

Amazon

Box sets

GameStop

Box sets

Hasbro Pulse

Box sets

Hasbro PulseCon

Box sets

HasLab

Target

Walgreens

Walmart

See also
Toy Biz had several related lines of toys of Marvel Comics characters, often exhibiting comparable articulation, and similar scale.
 DC Multiverse
 DC Universe Classics
 Fantastic Four Classics
 Hulk Classics
 Iron Man: The Armored Avenger
 Spider-Man Classics
 X-Men Classics

References

External links
 ToyBiz.com Official ToyBiz site
 Hasbro.com Official Hasbro site
 MarvelousNews.com Daily Marvel Legends News, Complete Photo Database and Collector Community
 Stashmatic.com Marvel Legends database with images
 MarvelLegends.Net Marvel Legends Photo Database, News and Forums
 marvellegends.info The Complete Guide to Marvel Legends
 marvellegends.hyves.nl A Marvel Legends site from the Netherlands
 Free Marvel Legends iOS Checklist Application
 Visual and Price guides for Marvel Legends Action Figures

Hasbro products
2000s toys
2010s toys
Marvel Comics action figure lines